The Greece national futsal team is controlled by the Hellenic Football Federation, the governing body for futsal in Greece and represents the country in international futsal competitions, such as the World Cup and the European Championships. The greatest achievement of the Greece national futsal team is the qualification to the second preliminary round of the European Championships of 2014. The coach of the team is Stefanos Soilemes since 2008. The players are chosen from the Greek Futsal Super League, the Futsal Championship of Greece. The last years there is a player, Konstantinos Panou who plays in Spain. As the team is in position number 81 of the Futsal World Ranking has to pass through both the first and the second preliminary round in order to play to a competition like World Cup or Euro.

Roster

Theofilou Dimitrios
Stolis Petros
Manos Antonis
Kondylatos Spyridon
Darlas Dimitrios
Konstantinou Ilias
Panou Konstantinos
Jaime Wilsonopoulos
Malovic Konstantinos
Karmis Dimitrios
Raphael Ioannidis
Karavidas Dimitrios
Gritzalis Spyridon
Bardis Panagiotis
Asimakopoulos Vasilis
Katevtsian Petros
Xristos Dimitropoulos
Papaefstratiou Stratis
Gkayfilias Apostolis

Coach

Coach of the team is Stefanos Soilemes since 2008. He is also the coach of the U21 Greece national futsal team. Stefanos Soilemes was born in Germany and came to Greece in 1992. He was a futsal player from 1997 to 2007, playing in teams like Iniochos and Keratsini and from 2000 he was a member of the Greece national futsal team. In 2007 he was the assistant coach of Sergey Stulov in the team and he took over the team in 2008. From 2012 until today he is also the coach of the Beach Soccer national Greek team.

Competition history 
The Greece national futsal team remains unqualified for a major competition. The biggest achievement is the qualification to the second preliminary round of the European Championships of 2014. In this round the team defeated Poland and lost to Portugal and Serbia.

UEFA Futsal Euro 2018

The team trained for the first qualifying round of the Futsal Euro 2018. Greece played against Wales, Moldova and San Marino. The matches took place in Wales in the end of January 2017. The first of this group played against Spain, Serbia and Poland in a group that took place in Poland in March or April 2017. As a part of this preparation Greece national futsal team played against Bulgaria and Turkey in Chalkida in a tournament that took place in Chalkida, Greece in November 2016.

References

External links
Hellenic Football Federation 

Futsal365.gr  (Greek Futsal News Portal)

Greece
Futsal
Futsal in Greece